St Aldhelm's Roman Catholic Church in Malmesbury, Wiltshire, England is a Roman Catholic Church built in 1875. The church is dedicated to St Aldhelm who lived in Malmesbury and was the abbot at nearby Malmesbury Abbey.

Buildings
St Aldhelm's Roman Catholic Church is built in uncoursed stone with ashlar dressings, in 14th-century gothic style. It is set back from Cross Hayes, the town's former marketplace (now a car park), to which it presents its west façade where a large two-light trefoil-headed window is flanked by two plain lancets.

Immediately south of the church is the presbytery. The Grade II listed building incorporates a single-storey 19th-century former stable to Cross Hayes House, built in squared limestone, with a later rear extension in limestone rubble.

History
The church was founded in 1875 by French priest Francois Larive MSFS, who was the first Missionary of St Francis de Sales to work in England. The idea of founding a church in Malmesbury was given to him by Captain Charles Goddard Dewell of the 91st Argyllshire Regiment of Foot, who was born and raised in Malmesbury. The two met in 1858 while Captain Dewell was posted to the village of Kamptee in India. Dewell had recently been baptised into the Roman Catholic Church after being converted to Catholicism following falling ill while serving in Italy. He wanted to start a church in his home town, so after much discussion with Father Larive, the two decided to set up a church in Malmesbury.

In 1861, Father Larive and Dewell came to Malmesbury, and they decided on a site for the church: Cross Hayes House, which was owned by Dewell. There were delays with the transfer of the lease of the house, so it did not become available until 1867. It was in that year that Captain Dewell became a lay brother in the Society of Jesus and opened a school, despite fierce local opposition, including from the local member of parliament. A temporary church was set up on newly purchased adjoining land in 1869, and used until the present church was opened on 1 July 1875. Father Larive dedicated the church to St Aldhelm who was the patron saint of the town and was the founder and first abbot at the nearby Malmesbury Abbey from 675 to 705.

The site of the old church became St. Joseph's Primary School, run by and named after the Sisters of St Joseph of Annecy with whom Father Larive had previously worked. The school remained there until 1933 when it moved to its current site on Holloway Hill.

References

Malmesbury
Malmesbury